The International Police Association (IPA) is a Non-Governmental Organization for members of the police force, whether active duty or retired. By 2021, there were more than 360,000 members in nearly 100 countries, of which 65 are affiliated National Sections. The IPA is committed to the principles as set out in the Universal Declaration of Human Rights as adopted by the United Nations in 1948, and is in Consultative (Special) Status with the Economic and Social Council of the United Nations, and also is in Consultative Status with the Organization of American States and UNESCO.

History

The IPA is founded 
In the years of 1948-49, Arthur Troop made contact with his police friends in both the UK and abroad. In 1949 he had an article published in the British Police Review under the pseudonym of ‘Aytee’.  Arthur proceeded and the IPA was founded on  January 1, 1950 under the Esperanto motto 'Servo per Amikeco' (Service Through Friendship). Arthur Troop became the first Secretary General of the British Section. His notion of an association with development of social, cultural and professional links among its members, in  environment free from distinction of rank, gender, race, language or religion, became a reality.

1st IPA World Congress 
With the help of early pioneers, Arthur Troop worked to encourage the founding of other National Sections. From small beginnings the IPA message quickly took hold and the formation of new Sections throughout the world became rapid. Soon there were sections in the majority of Western Europe. In 1955, at the first International Executive Committee meeting in Paris, Arthur Troop became the first International Secretary General, a post he held until he stood down in 1966 for personal reasons.

First sections outside of Europe affiliated 
On 16 March 1961 at the World Congress held in Paris, the first sections outside of Europe - Canada and Hong Kong, were affiliated. At the third World Congress held in Stuttgart, Germany, in September 1961, the first African IPA section was also affiliated, with IPA Kenya joining the association.

First female PEB member elected 
1982 saw the election of the first female IPA member to the PEB, the former name of the International Executive Board, Phyllis Nolan of IPA Section Ireland. She served for 12 years, initially as the second and then first Vice President. Phyllis also served as President of IPA Section Ireland and is currently Chair of that section’s Region 4 and the manager of the IPA House in Dublin.

International Administration Center formed 
In 1986, due to the increasing membership of the Association, the need for permanent staff was identified. It was recognized that it would be increasingly difficult to move the administration from Section to Section as had been the practice until then. As such, a permanent center was established in the United Kingdom in 1987 at the headquarters building of Section UK.

Structure

International Executive Board 
The International Executive Board (IEB) is responsible for the day-to-day management of the IPA. It's made up of eight IPA members who are elected by the membership at the World Congress and they serve for a 4-year term.

External Relations Commission 
The ERC continued its work in promoting the IPA within organizations the IPA collaborates with by taking part in meetings and conferences, such as the UNODC’s 27th "Session on Crime" in Vienna in 2018 and "the International Conference of INGOs" at UNESCO in Paris in 2018.

Professional Commission (PC) 
The PC concentrates on the professional aspect of the association, including the following projects relating to police structure and development. It is chaired by Demetris Demetriou.

Young Police Officers' Seminar (YPOS) 
The YPOS is a training event for young IPA members from Law Enforcement Agencies, held every second year. The organizer of the YPOS 2019 was IPA Section UK, with the event taking place in Stirling, Scotland. In total, 44 young police officers from 25 sections participated in the YPOS and enjoyed professional lectures, as well as social and cultural outings.

Arthur Troop Scholarships (ATS) 
The ATS is awarded annually to 10 – 15 IPA members for professional education and advanced training, with the aim of aiding IPA members in their professional development in memory of the founder of the IPA. The ATS may be awarded to any IPA member active in a law enforcement role, but is predominantly targeted at our younger members.

International Learning and Development Exchange Program 
The International Learning and Development Exchange Program (ILDEP) relates to an international exchange of IPA members pertaining to their professional working role and is placed under the responsibility of the Chairperson of the PC. The exchange has a focus on sharing knowledge, an exchange of ideas, practices, and policy.

International Education and Information Center 
Gimborn Castle, in Germany, houses the IPA's International Education and Conference Center, and is widely referred to as the Flagship of the Association. It is here where professional seminars, conferences and meetings are held in idyllic wooded mountainous surroundings, some 30 miles east of Cologne in the German State of North Rhine-Westphalia. IBZ Gimborn was founded on 25 October 1969  by a group led by Günter Kratz, Hans Jansen and Theo Leenders. They seized the opportunity to rent the castle from Baron von Fürstenberg. Conversion work was started on the main building and the defunct local primary school. Seminars initially were held in nearby Dürhölzen.

Socio-Cultural Commission (SCC) 
The SCC is responsible for the development and promotion of social and cultural activities within the IPA, with a focus on the following tasks: It is chaired by Kyriakos Karkalis.

 International sports events and championships, including the IPA Games
 Travel opportunities for IPA members
 IPA Houses and other accommodation
 International Youth Gathering (IYG)
 International video, website, and photo competitions 
 Social projects
 IPA hobbies on an international level
 IPA Heritage
 The IPA Virtual Race Week
 The IPA Children's Painting Competition
 Hosting project
 Pen Pal Project

Travel Assistance 
IPA Sections frequently arrange friendship weeks for members and their families to promote the culture and traditions of their countries, thus facilitating cross-border understanding. Many members participate in these events, while others travel on their own, with help from the sections they visit

IPA Houses 
Many sections offer IPA members accommodation options: More than 40 IPA Houses are available, offering reasonably priced accommodation, plus the IPA has many other accommodation options available, including members’ holiday homes and discounts at hotels. IPA Houses and other accommodations are advertised in the IPA Hosting Book, with at present 264 hosting options.

International Sports Events 
Sports events and championships are arranged worldwide with numerous IPA members participating. The IPA Games is the latest contribution and is organized biennially. IPA Portugal hosted the IPA Games 2018, and IPA Montenegro will be the host for the next IPA Games.

Organizational Goals 
The Association's goals are to promote international cooperation in social, cultural and professional fields, encourage peaceful co-existence between peoples and preservation of world peace, improve the public image of the police service and enhances recognition of the IPA by international bodies.

World Congress 
The World Congress is a prestigious IPA event which has been hosted annually since 1955, when the first congress took place in Paris. Since then 34 sections, on 6 continents, have hosted this annual gathering. The last 5 years saw IPA Congresses taking place in Limassol, Cyprus (2015); Auckland, New Zealand (2016); Albena, Bulgaria (2017); Rotterdam, the Netherlands (2018) and Dubrovnik, Croatia (2019).

64th World Congress 
The 64th IPA World Congress 2019 took place in the coastal resort of Cavtat, near Dubrovnik, from 8-13 October 2019. The facilities chosen by the hosting section combined a beautiful setting with excellent meeting facilities, including a congress hall providing ample space for around 300 congress participants from 63 out of the IPA’s 67 affiliated sections. After a full day of congress sessions, everyone had the opportunity to relax and round off the day with a quick swim in the Adriatic Sea or a short stroll into historic Cavtat.

See also
International Association of Women Police

References

External links
 International Police Association - International Administrative Center

International nongovernmental organizations
Law enforcement
Organisations based in Nottingham
1950 establishments in England